William Ferdinand Shija (28 April 1947 – 4 October 2014) was a Tanzanian politician and the former Secretary General of the Commonwealth Parliamentary Association between 2007 and 2014. He had also served as a member of the African Union's Pan-African Parliament.

Early life and career
Before entering politics, Shilja worked as a civil servant and a teacher. After receiving higher education in India and the United States, he taught communications in Tanzania.

Politics
Shija was a member of the National Assembly of Tanzania from 1990 to 2005. During this time he held the positions of Minister for Science, Technology and Higher Education; Minister for Information and Broadcasting; Minister for Energy and Minerals; and Minister for Industries and Trade. He was a member of the Pan-African Parliament in 2004 and 2005 and chaired the Committee on Education, Culture, Tourism and Human Resources. He was appointed the first African Secretary-General of the Commonwealth Parliamentary Association on September 9, 2006 and took up the position on 1 January 2007. His term lasted until 2014.

Personal life
Shija was married with five children. When he assumed the post of Secretary-General of the CPA, he lived in London. Dr. Shija was a patron for a Welsh based charity that works extensively in Tanzania.

Death
He died on 4 October 2014 in London. He was buried in his home village of Nyampande in Sengerema District, Mwanza Region.

References

1947 births
2014 deaths
Tanzanian educators
Chama Cha Mapinduzi MPs
Tanzanian MPs 2000–2005
Members of the National Assembly (Tanzania)
Members of the Pan-African Parliament from Tanzania
Government ministers of Tanzania
Howard University alumni